Opatje Selo is a village in the Municipality of Miren-Kostanjevica in the Littoral region of Slovenia, right on the border with Italy. It is located on the Karst Plateau, along an old road leading from Komen to Gorizia. It includes the former hamlet of Mačeče.

Name
Opatje Selo was attested in written sources in 1494 as Appatzell; the name of the village means 'abbot's village' in Slovene. The name derives from the 12th century, when the village was first mentioned, because it was owned by the Benedictine monastery in nearby Duino.

Because of the frequency of two surnames, the northern half of the village is known as Marušičev konec 'the Marušič part' and the southern half as Pahorjev konec 'the Pahor part'.

History
During World War I, the Battles of the Isonzo between Austria-Hungary and Italy took place here. The houses were rebuilt after the war, and water mains were installed in 1921.

Church
The parish church in the settlement is dedicated to Saint Andrew and belongs to the Diocese of Koper.

Notable people
Notable people that were born or lived in Opatje Selo include:
Darko Marušič (a.k.a. Blaž, 1919–1943), communist activist and People's Hero of Yugoslavia
Drago Marušič (1884–1964), Slovene and Yugoslav politician

References

External links

Opatje Selo on Geopedia

Populated places in the Municipality of Miren-Kostanjevica